Active Bangladesh military aircraft is a list of military aircraft that are used by the Bangladesh Armed Forces.

Approximately 80 aircraft and five Mil Mi-17 were destroyed by the devastating 1991 Bangladesh cyclone.

Bangladesh Air Force

Bangladesh Army

Bangladesh Navy

See also

 List of historic Bangladesh military aircraft
 Bangabandhu Aeronautical Centre

References

Bangladesh military aircraft, active
Military equipment of Bangladesh
Bangladesh military-related lists